Nwachukwu is the surname of:

 Fortunatus Nwachukwu (born 1960), Nigerian Catholic archbishop and diplomat of the Holy See 
 Igwe Aja-Nwachukwu (1952–2015), Nigerian politician 
 Ike Nwachukwu (born 1940), Nigerian army officer and politician 
 Mary Nwachukwu (born 1969), Nigerian handball player
 Obinna Nwachukwu (born 1992), Nigerian footballer
 Sorina Nwachukwu (born 1987), German track star
 Sunny Nwachukwu (born 1976), Nigerian footballer
 Uti Nwachukwu (born 1982), Nigerian television personality 
 Uzoma Nwachukwu (born 1990), American football player 
 Zainab Balogun-Nwachukwu (born 1989), Nigerian actress

Nigerian names